Order and Chaos is a variant of the game tic-tac-toe on a 6×6 . It was invented by Stephen Sniderman and introduced by him in Games magazine in 1981. The player Order strives to create a five-in-a-row of either Xs or Os. The opponent Chaos endeavors to prevent this.

Game rules
Unlike typical board games, both players control both sets of pieces (Xs and Os). Order plays first, then turns alternate. On each turn, a player places either an X or an O on any open square. Once played, pieces cannot be moved, thus Order and Chaos can be played using pencil and paper.

Order aims to get five like pieces in a row either vertically, horizontally, or diagonally. Chaos aims to fill the board without completion of a line of five like pieces.

Rules addition
The original rules in Games magazine implied that six-in-a-row also wins. That version of the game was claimed weakly solved as a forced win for Order. The inventor has subsequently suggested a new rule to better balance winning chances for both sides: Six-in-a-row does not qualify as a win. The new rule offers Chaos new defensive tactics against Order's previously "unstoppable" four-in-a-rows. This version is weakly solved as a forced win for Chaos, who can win using a Pairing strategy.

See also
 Entropy (1977 board game)

References

External links

Board games introduced in 1981
Tic-tac-toe variants
Mathematical games
Paper-and-pencil games
Abstract strategy games
In-a-row games
Solved games